The Union of Greens of Russia (UGR; ; Soyuz zelonykh Rossii, SZR) or Green Russia (Zelonaya Rossiya) was a political party in Russia that was active from 2005 until 2006.

In 2005, the organization was founded as an independent party, but in 2006, it merged with the party Yabloko as an ecological faction "Green Russia". The "Union of Greens of Russia" and the faction "Green Russia" of Yabloko were headed by professor Alexey Yablokov, the founder of Greenpeace USSR in the 1980s.

The faction "Green Russia" is an associate member of the European Green Party.

See also 

Green party
Green politics
List of environmental organizations
 Civil United Green Alternative
 Russian Ecological Party "The Greens" (former KEDR Party)
 Alliance of Greens – The People's Party (political party founded in 2012)

References

External links
 Green Russia faction
 Green Russia (europeangreens.eu)

Green political parties in Russia
Yabloko
European Green Party
Defunct political parties in Russia
Political parties established in 2005
Political parties disestablished in 2006
2006 disestablishments in Russia
2005 establishments in Russia